Rachel Zenzinger is an American politician from the state of Colorado. A Democrat, Zenzinger has represented the 19th district of the Colorado Senate since 2017, following her defeat of Laura J. Woods; she previously represented the same seat from her appointment in 2013 until 2015. Before that, Zenzinger served on the Arvada City Council.

Personal life and education
Zenzinger earned a bachelor's degree and master's degree from Regis University.

Career
Zenzinger was elected to the Arvada City Council in 2008. She became Mayor Pro Tem in 2011.

Zenzinger was appointed to the state senate following the resignation of Evie Hudak. Zenzinger was the campaign manager of Hudak's 2012 campaign.

References

External links
Twitter account
Legislative website
Campaign website

Living people
Colorado city council members
People from Arvada, Colorado
Women city councillors in Colorado
Women state legislators in Colorado
Democratic Party Colorado state senators
Year of birth missing (living people)
21st-century American politicians
21st-century American women politicians
Place of birth missing (living people)